Kateh-ye Shast Abadan (also Romanized as Kateh-ye Shaşt Ābādān; also known as Kashtabadan, Kat-e Shaşt Ābādān, Katsaf Abadan, and Katshaşt-e Ābādān) is a village in Chahardeh Rural District, in the Central District of Astaneh-ye Ashrafiyeh County, Gilan Province, Iran. At the 2006 census, its population was 515, in 162 families.

References 

Populated places in Astaneh-ye Ashrafiyeh County